Mohamed Laichoubi was the Algerian minister for labour and social affairs in the 1995 government of Mokdad Sifi.

References

Algerian politicians
Living people
Year of birth missing (living people)
Place of birth missing (living people)
21st-century Algerian people